Dương Văn Nhựt (Mỹ Tho,  1920 – 2000) was a brigadier general in the North Vietnamese army during the Vietnam War. He was also brother of Dương Văn Minh, the last president of South Vietnam.

References

Generals of the People's Army of Vietnam
Vietnamese people of the Vietnam War
2000 deaths
1920s births
People from Mỹ Tho